Scalenodontoides is an extinct genus of traversodontidae, a family of herbivorous cynodonts. It lived during the Late Triassic in what is now South Africa. Its type species is Scalenodontoides macrodontes. It was named in 1957 by A. W. Crompton and F. Ellenberger. Arctotraversodon plemmyrodon was originally classified as a species of Scalenodontoides, but was given its own genus in 1992. It is found in the Scalenodontoides Assemblage Zone of the Elliot Formation, which is named for it. It is one of the geologically youngest traversodontids, alongside the putative traversodontid Boreogomphodon. It is closely related to Exaeretodon and Siriusgnathus, but is distinguished by the presence of a shelf-like expansion of its parietal called the nuchal table.

References

Bibliography

 
 
 
 
 
 
 

Traversodontids
Prehistoric cynodont genera
Late Triassic synapsids